West Franklin High School (WFHS) is a four-year, comprehensive, public high school located in Pomona, Kansas, United States, serving grades 9 through 12. The school was established in 2007 with the merger of Williamsburg High School and Pomona High School. It is currently the only high school within the city limits of Pomona. The school mascot is the Falcon and the school colors are blue and silver. In 2013, the school was selected as a National Blue Ribbon School.

There are several extracurricular activities that are offered, both athletic and non-athletic. Athletic teams compete in the Flint Hills League and are classified as a 3A school according to the KSHSAA.

Administration
West Franklin High School is currently under the leadership of Principal Matt Brenzikofer, and Assistant Principal, Ericka Waller.

History
It was founded in 2007 with the merger of Williamsburg High School and Pomona High School.  It is located at the former Pomona High School's site.

It is the only high school in West Franklin Unified School District 287, although the West Franklin Learning Center, an alternative school, has high school level students.

Academics
In 2013, West Franklin High School was selected as a Blue Ribbon School. The Blue Ribbon Award recognizes public and private schools which perform at high levels or have made significant academic improvements.

Extracurricular Activities
West Franklin High School offers a variety of extracurricular activities for the students. The Falcons compete in the Flint Hills League and are classified as a 3A school, the third-largest classification in Kansas according to the Kansas State High School Activities Association. The athletic teams are known as the "Falcons".
A list of sports offered at the school is listed below:

Athletics

Fall Sports
 Fall Cheerleading
 Cross country
 Football
 Girls' Golf
 Volleyball

Winter Sports
 Basketball
 Winter Cheerleading
 Sapphire's Dance Team

Spring Sports
 Baseball
 Boys' Golf
 Softball
 Track and Field

Clubs/Organizations
West Franklin High School offers a variety of clubs/organizations for the students. A list of clubs offered, are listed below:

 Band
 Choir
 FBLA
 FCCLA
 FFA
 Forensics
 National Honor Society
 Scholar's Bowl
 Student Council

See also
 List of high schools in Kansas
 List of unified school districts in Kansas

References

External links
 
 District website
 Pomona city map, KDOT
 Franklin County map, KDOT

Public high schools in Kansas
Educational institutions established in 2007
Schools in Franklin County, Kansas
2007 establishments in Kansas